Mohammed Ahmed Alhassan (born 21 January 1954) is a Ghanaian police officer and former United Nations official. He is the commanding officer of the Ghana Police Service and was the Inspector General of Police under the John Dramani Mahama administration.

Previous positions
In 2005, he was appointed as Police Commissioner for the United Nations Mission in Liberia (UNMIL).

References

External links

Ghanaian police officers
Alumni of Cardiff University
University of Ghana alumni
Academic staff of the University of Ghana
Living people
1954 births
Ghanaian Inspector Generals of Police
Place of birth missing (living people)
T.I. Ahmadiyya Senior High School (Kumasi) alumni